The canton of Port-Jérôme-sur-Seine (before March 2020: canton of Notre-Dame-de-Gravenchon) is an administrative division of the Seine-Maritime department, in northern France. It was created at the French canton reorganisation which came into effect in March 2015. Its seat is in Port-Jérôme-sur-Seine.

It consists of the following communes:

Anquetierville
Arelaune-en-Seine
Bolleville
La Frénaye
Grand-Camp
Heurteauville
Lintot
Louvetot
Maulévrier-Sainte-Gertrude
Norville
Notre-Dame-de-Bliquetuit
Petiville
Port-Jérôme-sur-Seine
Rives-en-Seine
Saint-Arnoult
Saint-Aubin-de-Crétot
Saint-Gilles-de-Crétot
Saint-Maurice-d'Ételan 
Saint-Nicolas-de-la-Haie
Trouville
Vatteville-la-Rue

References

Cantons of Seine-Maritime